Jean Lécuyer (born 20 April 1876, date of death unknown) was a French track and field athlete who competed at the 1900 Summer Olympics in Paris, France. Lécuyer competed in the 110 metre hurdles, finishing in fourth place overall.  He won his first-round heat in a walk-over before finishing fourth of four starters in the final.

References

 De Wael, Herman. Herman's Full Olympians: "Athletics 1900". Accessed 18 March 2006.

External links 
 
 

Athletes (track and field) at the 1900 Summer Olympics
Olympic athletes of France
French male hurdlers
1876 births
Year of death missing